The 2021 New York City Comptroller election consisted of Democratic and Republican primaries for New York City Comptroller on June 22, 2021, followed by a general election on November 2, 2021. The primaries were the first NYC Comptroller election primaries to use ranked-choice voting. The primary and general election were held alongside concurrent primaries and elections for mayor, Public Advocate, Borough Presidents, and City Council.

Incumbent New York City Comptroller Scott Stringer was barred from running for a third term by term limits, and ran for mayor. The Democratic candidate, City Council Member Brad Lander won the general election over the Republican candidate Daby Benjaminé Carreras. Lander took office as the 45th NYC Comptroller on January 1, 2022.

Democratic primary

Background
The first candidate to enter the race was New York City Council Member Helen Rosenthal, who filed to run for the position on June 16, 2018, three years before the election was due to take place. Rosenthal stated that the early campaign filing was to allow for people who wanted to support her run to donate, and that she would only begin campaigning "in a few years". Brad Lander, another City Council Member, announced his campaign in January 2019. Lander was considered to be a staunchly left-wing Democrat. Rosenthal withdrew from the race on July 10, 2020, citing poor fundraising numbers.

By October 2020 four people had emerged as likely major candidates; State senators Brian Benjamin and Kevin Parker, Lander, and state assemblyman David Weprin. Of the four, Benjamin and Lander had achieved larger fundraising hauls and more support from elected officials. Benjamin officially launched his campaign on October 16, emphasizing his experience in the State Senate and work on police reform, and also drawing attention to his experience in the finance industry. Benjamin's base of support was primarily concentrated in Upper Manhattan, and he posted strong fundraising numbers following his announcement. By this stage of the campaign Lander was considered the frontrunner by the Gotham Gazette, as his base of support among left-wing Democrats was not limited to a single borough. Parker announced his campaign on November 12, emphasizing his work on police reform in the State Senate. Parker was noted by the Gazette as having posted weak fundraising numbers in comparison to the other candidates, and he had a history of personal controversies that were considered potential hindrances to his campaign. Weprin announced his campaign on December 6, emphasizing his experience with New York City's finances as a result of his previous experience on the City Council. Weprin's base of support was localised mostly in Queens, and he campaigned as a moderate.

During January 2021, two additional candidates entered the race; Michelle Caruso-Cabrera, a former journalist who had unsuccessfully attempted to run for congress in 2020, and Zach Iscol, a non-profit executive who had previously been running for Mayor of New York. Both Caruso-Cabrera and Iscol portrayed themselves as moderates, with Caruso-Cabrera emphasising her experience reporting on finance as a journalist, while Iscol was noted as a close associate of the Clinton family. Upon his entry into the race, Iscol was criticised by Benjamin, who described him as a "privileged and failed mayoral candidate". In February 2021, Speaker of the New York City Council Corey Johnson, who had waged an abortive campaign for mayor the previous year, began to privately signal that he was interested in running for Comptroller. Johnson was held to be a formidable candidate, as the high public profile of his position as Council speaker meant that he had far higher name recognition than the other candidates, and he had also amassed a considerable financial war chest due to his brief mayoral campaign. However, Johnson had also undergone a politically damaging fight the previous year over the budget of the New York Police Department, where his attempts to bridge the gap between factions who wanted to maintain the Department's budget and those who wanted to reduce it considerably had left him unpopular with both.

On March 9, 2021, Johnson entered the race, promising to run a positive campaign in his launch announcement. Johnson's entry into the race dealt a considerable blow to Lander, as both men were felt to be on the left of the Democratic Party, but Johnson had far higher name recognition and more support from labor unions. Johnson's entry into the race also caused several elected officials who had previously been expected to endorse Lander, such as popular Bronx Congressman Ritchie Torres, to instead throw their support behind Johnson. Lander's campaign would receive a boost in early March, however, when well-known Congresswoman Alexandria Ocasio-Cortez, who was popular among progressives, endorsed him, which was viewed as helping Lander appeal to more left-wing voters.

Candidates who raised at least $125,000 from at least 500 donors qualified for matching city funds from the New York City Campaign Finance Board, on an 8-to-1 match basis. As of February 16, 2021, three candidates had qualified for matching funds: Benjamin, Iscol, and Lander. Prior to the primary, Corey Johnson was considered the frontrunner, with Lander and Caruso-Cabrera vying for second place.

Candidates

Major declared candidates
The following candidates (listed alphabetically) held office, were included in polls, or were the subject of significant media coverage.

Other declared candidates
 Terri Liftin, investment officer
 Alex K. S. Pan, college student at Denison University and former groundskeeper

Withdrawn
 Helen Rosenthal, NYC Councilmember

Debates

Endorsements

Polling

Graphical summary (first-past-the-post polls)

Among those supporting a candidate (first-past-the-post polls)

Ranked-choice polls

First-past-the-post polls

Results

Republican Party

Candidate

Declared
 Daby Benjaminé Carreras, is a licensed registered representative FINRA CRD# 4873706. Title as described "Private Wealth Manager" at Spartan Capital Securities where he is principally a investment banker. He developed a nonprofit in 2015 named BRANDO which stands for Believe Recovery Awareness Now Diabetes Obesity. Which helps to fight the health crises, including kidney disease, obesity and diabetes that plagues communities. Daby also owns a business named Drain The Swamp, LLC which activities are activism aimed at helping improve the political climate in communities across the nation.

New York State Conservative Party

Candidate

Declared
Paul Rodriguez, former stock analyst and broker; currently running fund-raising for a major NYC area metropolitan charity.

Working Families Party

Candidate

Declared
Brad Lander  Petitions to be on the Working Families Party line were disqualified by the Board Of Elections.

Libertarian Party

Candidate

Declared
John Tabacco, TV host

General election

Results

See also

Government of New York City
2021 New York City mayoral election

Notes

Partisan clients

References

2021
New York City Comptroller
Comptroller election
Comptroller 2021
New York City Comptroller election